Kermit A. Sande (born February 23, 1943) is an American politician and attorney in the state of South Dakota. He served as Attorney General of South Dakota from 1973 to 1975, as a Democrat.

Education and career
He attended South Dakota State University graduating in 1964 and University of South Dakota School of Law graduating in 1968. He was the Beadle County Attorney from 1970 to 1972.

1972 South Dakota Attorney General election

Sande defeated Leonard Andera of Chamberlain; Pat Kirby of Mitchell and John Keller of Chamberlain at the Democratic convention.

On April 5, 1972, Ron Schmidt announced he was running for the Republican nomination. Schmidt was nominated by the Republican party at its convention after an unsuccessful run for the nomination in 1970 against incumbent Attorney General Gordon Mydland. James Brennan of Rapid City had announced his candidacy but withdrew before the voting began.

Sande won the general election by defeating Republican Ron Schmidt. Sande received 152,835 (51.60%) votes and Ron received 143,367 (48.40%) votes.

1974 South Dakota Attorney General election

Sande was defeated in his bid for reelection by William J. Janklow, who had worked for Sande as an assistant attorney general. Janklow received 173,658 (66.66%) votes and Sande received 86,865 (33.34%) votes.

References

External links

1943 births
Living people
20th-century American lawyers
University of South Dakota School of Law alumni
South Dakota Attorneys General
South Dakota Democrats
People from Huron, South Dakota